Cities and towns under the oblast's jurisdiction:
Smolensk (Смоленск) (administrative center)
city districts:
Leninsky (Ленинский)
Promyshlenny (Промышленный)
Zadneprovsky (Заднепровский)
Desnogorsk (Десногорск)
Districts:
Demidovsky (Демидовский)
Towns under the district's jurisdiction:
Demidov (Демидов)
Urban-type settlements under the district's jurisdiction:
Przhevalskoye resort settlement (Пржевальское)
with 16 rural okrugs under the district's jurisdiction.
Dorogobuzhsky (Дорогобужский)
Towns under the district's jurisdiction:
Dorogobuzh (Дорогобуж)
Urban-type settlements under the district's jurisdiction:
Verkhnedneprovsky (Верхнеднепровский)
with 12 rural okrugs under the district's jurisdiction.
Dukhovshchinsky (Духовщинский)
Towns under the district's jurisdiction:
Dukhovshchina (Духовщина)
Urban-type settlements under the district's jurisdiction:
Ozyorny (Озёрный)
with 6 rural okrugs under the district's jurisdiction.
Gagarinsky (Гагаринский)
Towns under the district's jurisdiction:
Gagarin (Гагарин)
with 15 rural okrugs under the district's jurisdiction.
Glinkovsky (Глинковский)
with 6 rural okrugs under the district's jurisdiction.
Kardymovsky (Кардымовский)
Urban-type settlements under the district's jurisdiction:
Kardymovo (Кардымово)
with 8 rural okrugs under the district's jurisdiction.
Khislavichsky (Хиславичский)
Urban-type settlements under the district's jurisdiction:
Khislavichi (Хиславичи)
with 11 rural okrugs under the district's jurisdiction.
Kholm-Zhirkovsky (Холм-Жирковский)
Urban-type settlements under the district's jurisdiction:
Kholm-Zhirkovsky (Холм-Жирковский)
with 15 rural okrugs under the district's jurisdiction.
Krasninsky (Краснинский)
Urban-type settlements under the district's jurisdiction:
Krasny (Красный)
with 12 rural okrugs under the district's jurisdiction.
Monastyrshchinsky (Монастырщинский)
Urban-type settlements under the district's jurisdiction:
Monastyrshchina (Монастырщина)
with 9 rural okrugs under the district's jurisdiction.
Novoduginsky (Новодугинский)
with 6 rural okrugs under the district's jurisdiction.
Pochinkovsky (Починковский)
Towns under the district's jurisdiction:
Pochinok (Починок)
with 16 rural okrugs under the district's jurisdiction.
Roslavlsky (Рославльский)
Towns under the district's jurisdiction:
Roslavl (Рославль)
with 21 rural okrugs under the district's jurisdiction.
Rudnyansky (Руднянский)
Towns under the district's jurisdiction:
Rudnya (Рудня)
Urban-type settlements under the district's jurisdiction:
Golynki (Голынки)
with 8 rural okrugs under the district's jurisdiction.
Safonovsky (Сафоновский)
Towns under the district's jurisdiction:
Safonovo (Сафоново)
Urban-type settlements under the district's jurisdiction:
Izdeshkovo (Издешково)
with 16 rural okrugs under the district's jurisdiction.
Shumyachsky (Шумячский)
Urban-type settlements under the district's jurisdiction:
Shumyachi (Шумячи)
with 7 rural okrugs under the district's jurisdiction.
Smolensky (Смоленский)
with 19 rural okrugs under the district's jurisdiction.
Sychyovsky (Сычёвский)
Towns under the district's jurisdiction:
Sychyovka (Сычёвка)
with 11 rural okrugs under the district's jurisdiction.
Tyomkinsky (Тёмкинский)
with 10 rural okrugs under the district's jurisdiction.
Ugransky (Угранский)
Urban-type settlements under the district's jurisdiction:
Ugra (Угра)
with 16 rural okrugs under the district's jurisdiction.
Velizhsky (Велижский)
Towns under the district's jurisdiction:
Velizh (Велиж)
with 9 rural okrugs under the district's jurisdiction.
Vyazemsky (Вяземский)
Towns under the district's jurisdiction:
Vyazma (Вязьма)
with 22 rural okrugs under the district's jurisdiction.
Yartsevsky (Ярцевский)
Towns under the district's jurisdiction:
Yartsevo (Ярцево)
with 11 rural okrugs under the district's jurisdiction.
Yelninsky (Ельнинский)
Towns under the district's jurisdiction:
Yelnya (Ельня)
with 11 rural okrugs under the district's jurisdiction.
Yershichsky (Ершичский)
with 9 rural okrugs under the district's jurisdiction.

References

Smolensk Oblast
Smolensk Oblast